Aleksey Slaviyevich Morozov (born 3 January 1966) is a Russian professional football coach and a former player.

Club career
He made his professional debut in the Soviet Second League in 1988 for FC Dynamo-2 Moscow. He played 4 games in the 1994–95 UEFA Cup with FC Tekstilshchik Kamyshin.

Throughout his career he always played on the same team as his identical twin brother Oleg Morozov.

References 

1966 births
People from Obninsk
Living people
Russian twins
Soviet footballers
Association football midfielders
Association football defenders
Russian footballers
Russian Premier League players
FC Fakel Voronezh players
FC Tekstilshchik Kamyshin players
FC Saturn Ramenskoye players
FC Lokomotiv Nizhny Novgorod players
Twin sportspeople
FC Dynamo Moscow reserves players
Russian football managers
Sportspeople from Kaluga Oblast